Anthony "Rebop" Kwaku Baah (13 February 1944 – 12 January 1983) was a Ghanaian percussionist who worked with the 1970s rock groups Traffic and Can.

Biography
Baah was born on 13 February 1944, in Konongo, Gold Coast.

In 1969, Baah performed on Randy Weston's album African Rhythms. In the same year he worked with Nick Drake on the song "Three Hours", posthumously released in 2004 on the compilation album Made to Love Magic. He then joined the English band Traffic in 1971, having met them in Sweden during a tour. He appeared on the albums Welcome to the Canteen, The Low Spark of High Heeled Boys, Shoot Out at the Fantasy Factory, On the Road, and When the Eagle Flies.

In 1973 he performed in the all-star Eric Clapton's Rainbow Concert. After Traffic disbanded in 1974, he played on Steve Winwood’s self-titled debut solo album, which was released in 1977. Also in 1977, he joined the German band Can along with former Traffic bassist Rosko Gee, playing with them until their breakup in 1979, appearing on the albums Saw Delight, Out of Reach and Can.

In 1982 Baah recorded an album with Zahara. Baah died of a cerebral hemorrhage during a performance in Stockholm, Sweden in January 1983, where he was on tour with Jimmy Cliff. His final album, Melodies in a Jungle Man's Head, was released in its unfinished state.

Discography

Solo
 1972 Reebop
 1973 Anthony Reebop Kwaku Baah
 1977 Trance (with Ganoua)
 1983 Melodies in a Jungle Man's Head

With Traffic
1971  Welcome to the Canteen
1971 The Low Spark of High Heeled Boys
1973 Shoot Out at the Fantasy Factory
1973 On the Road

With Can
1977 Saw Delight
1978 Out of Reach
1979 Can

With others
 1968 Wynder K. Frog, Out Of The Frying Pan
 1969 Randy Weston, African Cookbook
 1972 Jim Capaldi, Oh How We Danced
 1973 Eric Clapton, Eric Clapton's Rainbow Concert
 1973 Free, Heartbreaker, (played congas on "Wishing Well")
 1973 Rolling Stones, Goats Head Soup
 1973 Third World, Aiye-Keta (with Steve Winwood and Abdul Lasisi Amao)
 1974 Vivian Stanshall, Men Opening Umbrellas Ahead
 1975 Jim Capaldi, Short Cut Draw Blood
 1975 Billy Cobham A Funky Thide of Sings
 1977 Steve Winwood, Steve Winwood
 1983 The Unknown Cases, "Masimbabele" (12" 45)
 1983 The Unknown Cases, Cuba
 1983 Dunkelziffer, Colours and Soul
 1984 Wally Badarou, Echoes (played on the track "Jungle")
 1985 Free, "Wishing Well" 12" remix (played congas)

References

External links
[ Rebop Kwaku Baah] at Allmusic

1944 births
1983 deaths
Percussionists
Can (band) members
Traffic (band) members
Island Records artists
People from Ashanti Region
Ghanaian musicians
20th-century British musicians
20th-century German musicians
Zahara (band) members